The Ferrari 612P (the "P" stands for prototype, the "6" refers to the engine displacement, and the "12" denotes the number of cylinders), is a purpose-built Group 7 prototype, designed, developed and built by Scuderia Ferrari, specifically intended to be used in the North American Can-Am sports car racing series in 1968 and 1969.

Development history
In 1968, the management of Scuderia decided to build its own sports car for the CanAm racing series, popular in Canada and the United States, and to use it themselves. In 1967 a converted Ferrari 412P was used as a 412 Can-Am. The North American Racing Team from Luigi Chinetti organized the racing commitments.

The Ferrari 612 Can-Am had the 12-cylinder mid-engine initially used in the Ferrari 512S. The engine developed 620 hp with a displacement of almost 6.2 liters. In order to achieve sufficient traction for the rear wheels despite this performance, a powerful rear wing was mounted just behind the driver above the engine.

Racing history
The car made its debut in the fall of 1968. New Zealander Chris Amon, Scuderia works driver in Formula One and the sports car world championship, crashed out of the race in Las Vegas after just one lap. The entire 1969 season was only partially successful, as the Scuderia operated the missions only with limited commitment. Chris Amon's second place in Edmonton remained the best place for the car for the entire season. With third places in Watkins Glen and Mid-Ohio, Amon made two more podium finishes. It was succeeded by the Ferrari 712P Can-Am in 1970.

Technical specifications (612P Can-Am)
Year of construction 1968; used in 1968 and 1969
Motor:	12-cylinder V mid-engine
Bore × stroke:	 x 
Displacement :	
Compression:	10.5:1
Power:	455 kW (620 HP) @ 7000 rpm
Max. Torque:	 @ 5600 rpm
Crankshaft :	–
Motor control:	–
Mixture preparation: Lucas fuel injection
Fuel:	–
Tank capacity:	–
Cooling: water
Transmission: 4 aisles, 1 return aisle, installed longitudinally
Chassis: Aluminum riveted panels over steel tube frame.
Front suspension: Independent suspension on double wishbones, coil springs
Rear suspension: Independent suspension on double wishbones, coil springs
Shock absorber:	Hydraulic telescopic shock absorbers front and rear
Brakes:	Internally ventilated disc brakes all around, on the outside of the wheel carriers
Wheelbase: 
Track (Front/Rear): /
External dimensions (L/W/H): //
Dry weight :  ( in 1969)
Top speed:

References

Sports prototypes
Can-Am cars
Ferrari vehicles